Nataliya Kuligina (born 12 August 1971) is a Kyrgyzstani former judoka. She competed at the 1996 Summer Olympics and the 2000 Summer Olympics.

References

External links
 

1971 births
Living people
Kyrgyzstani female judoka
Olympic judoka of Kyrgyzstan
Judoka at the 1996 Summer Olympics
Judoka at the 2000 Summer Olympics
Place of birth missing (living people)
Judoka at the 1998 Asian Games
Asian Games competitors for Kyrgyzstan
20th-century Kyrgyzstani women
21st-century Kyrgyzstani women